Thaçi is a historical Albanian tribe (fis) and region in Pukë, Northern Albania. The ancestor of the Thaçi tribe are said to have come down Muriqan in Anamali in present day Montenegro. The Thaçi are often referred to as courageous and smart people by the neighboring tribes due to their supposed  qualities of slyness and deception.

Geography 
The historical tribal area of the Thaçi is south of the Drin in the District of Pukë. essentially it is south and southeast of fierza. The Thaçi also border the Berisha which is also another tribe from Pukë. The Thaçi throughout the years have settled in many more areas than just Pukë. Descendants of the Thaçi tribe can be found in Kosovo and the Vokshi tribe stem from the Thaçi tribe.

Origins 
The Thaçi were of polyphyletic origin thus they are not a traditional Albanian fis in the sense that they do not claim descendant from a common male ancestor.

History 
According to Franz Nopcsa, the ancestors of the Thaçi come from Montenegro. One of the ancestors of the Thaçi fled from Bushat into the mountains of Berisha around 1450-1480. His descendant called the Gjeci moved to Kodra e Gëges in Kryeziu territory. He had three sons who grew up there. they were called Geg Gjeci, Buç Gjeci and Pren Gjeci. they lived during the 1650s. Buç and Geg decided to convert to Islam. But they were afraid of Prens reaction so they decided to keep their intentions a secret. Buç converted and then we Geg was supposed to he grew fearful of what his older brother might do. Geg told pren that he had gone back on his intentions to convert to Islam, whilst he told Buç that he already had and he pledged that he nor his descendants would ever eat pork. Buç became the ancestral father of the Muslim Thaçi whilst Geg and pren became the ancestral father for the rest of the Thaçi. Geg Gjeci's descendants kept their pledge until the early 20th century. This almost ended up in a shot out between the liberal and conservative descendants of Geg Gjeci.

After the near violent encounter between the three brothers they separated. For this reason, the newcomers placed themselves under the protection of the ancestors of Liman Aga. Initially, the protection was to their advantage because they succeeded in pushing the Berisha out, down to the Lumi i Dardhës (Dardha River). Later, however, their liege lord, a certain Sulejman Aga, began to bully them and even went so far as to demand of Bal Alija, who lived around 1780, that he bring a sheaf of grain back from a mountainside where grain did not grow. This was not the end of it. He scolded Bal Alija and sent him back up the mountain. This deed led to a revolt among the Thaçi against their landowner. They refused to recognize his authorities and the conflict has resulted in a good number of persistent skirmishes up to recent times. Because the Bugjoni drove the Berisha out, there is still hereditary hostility between the two tribes today, and a murder committed between them cannot be atoned for with money.

The Thaçi proved to be very difficult to rule during the Ottoman period. The Ottoman Turks eventually grew tired and in 1744 they burnt down the houses of around 105 families which forced them to migrate into the Gjakova region. According to Robert Elsie, the Vokshi tribe, which settled in Kosovo in the region between Junik and Deçan, actually in the villages of Junik, Lloçan and Pobërxhe, originates from Thaçi. In addition to this tribe, it is said that the Elshani, Sopi and Kabashi tribes are also descended from the Thaçi tribe.

Notable People
 Sulejman Vokshi -  Albanian military commander and a leader of the League of Prizren
 Hashim Thaçi - Kosovar politician who was the President of Kosovo from April 2016 until his resignation on 5 November 2020
 Menduh Thaçi - Leader of the Macedonian political party Democratic Party of Albanians
 Fatmir Limaj - Kosovo-Albanian politician

References

Tribes of Albania
Surnames
Albanian-language surnames